St. Joseph's College of Arts & Science, is a general degree college located in Cuddalore, Tamil Nadu. It was established in the year 1991. The college is affiliated with Annamalai University . This college offers different courses in arts, commerce and science.

Departments

Science
Physics
chemistry 
Mathematics
Statistics
Microbiology
Biochemistry

Computer Science
Computer Applications
Psychology

Arts and Commerce
Tamil
English
History
Economics
Social Work
Business Administration
Commerce

Accreditation
The college is  recognized by the University Grants Commission (UGC).

References

External links

Educational institutions established in 1991
1991 establishments in Tamil Nadu
Colleges affiliated to Thiruvalluvar University
Cuddalore
Academic institutions formerly affiliated with the University of Madras